Índia pega no laço is a phrase used in Brazil that translates to "an Indian woman caught by the lasso". The phrase is commonly used by non-Indigenous Brazilians, particularly white Brazilians, who claim that they have an Indigenous female ancestor and is a reference to the male settlers of Brazil allegedly using lassos to capture Indigenous women. It is regarded as racist and misogynistic, particularly by Indigenous Brazilian women, because it is often used to romanticise or make a joke of the supposed abduction and rape of an Indigenous ancestor. The phrases "pega a dente de cachorro" (caught in the teeth of a dog) or "pega a casco de cavalo" (horseback) are also used to the same effect.

Critiques of the phrase
The phrase has been widely discussed particularly by Brazilian anthropologists, as well as by Indigenous people.

Historicity
The trope of the captured Indigenous (great, great) grandmother is a standard origin myth for many white Brazilian families but does also reflect "in part" the facts of centuries of violence against indigenous women. For example, in a paper discussing the phrase, Indigenous academic Mirna P Marinho da Silva Anaquiri reports a quote from a teacher in Goiânia interviewed as part of her fieldwork:

Cultural appropriation
A high proportion of white Brazilians, at least one third, are descended from Indigenous women on the maternal line. Anthropologist, Julie A Cavignac, describes how white Brazilian families repeat the same story, down the generations: of an Indigenous young woman, kidnapped by a white man, taken far from her in home (in the forest or on the sierra), kept isolated from the rest of the family until she is "tamed" by having children. The image of the wild Indian woman merges with the representation of the natural world - the feminine world corresponding to the primordial time of the Indigenous ascendancy.

Similarly, Alcida Rita Ramos believes that claiming a distant Indigenous ancestor is a way of claiming an authentic Brazilian identity:

Ramos obseves that the claim to "Indian blood" is an "abstraction with no material cost"; she writes, "The Indian grandmother is like an ornament that one wears one day and puts away the next."  Ramos argues that in the Brazilian national imagination, a "good Indian" is one who remotely contributed her blood to the soil of the Brazilian nation but who is far removed from modern day life.

Normalising violence against women
Many other commentators have criticised the phrase as normalizing and trivializing rape and violence against Indigenous women. For example, the Indigenous Brazilian writer and educator Daniel Munduruku, a member of the Munduruku people, has written that it is bizarre for non-Indigenous Brazilians to be proud that their great-grandfather supposedly had raped and enslaved their great-grandmother and forced her to bear unwanted children and make jokes about the pain and suffering she endured. Other critics analyse the violence implicit in the phrase as reflecting an ongoing culture of violence against women, Indigenous and non-Indigenous. For example, Purí commentator, Raial Orutu Puri in a Ted X talk entitled My grandmother was "pega no laço"  moves from discussing the violence against her female ancestors, to the violence against her nation, to the violence committed against all Indigenous women and nations, and from there to contemporary violence against women in Brazil. Similarly, in her paper about the phrase, academic Mirna P Marinho da Silva Anaquiri discusses the availability in Brazil of car bumper stickers showing a cowboy lassoing women. She writes:

See also
Indigenous peoples in Brazil
Native American ancestry
Pardo Brazilians
Race and ethnicity in Brazil
Rape culture
Violence against women
White Brazilians

References

Anti-indigenous racism in South America
European-Brazilian culture
Forced marriage
Indigenous feminism
Indigenous peoples in Brazil
Misogyny
Multiracial affairs in Brazil
Portuguese words and phrases
Racism in Brazil
Rape in Brazil
Sexism in Brazil
Violence against Indigenous women
Women in Brazil